The 2020 Football Championship of Luhansk Oblast was won by Skif Shulhynka.

As the last season, the competition also consisted of two stages, but in different way. All participants were splint into two groups at the first stage with the best 3 from each qualifying for the First League, the second best 3 for the Second League.

First stage

Group 1

Group 2

First League

References
Чемпионат Луганской области 2020. footballfacts.ru

Football
Luhansk
Luhansk